The General Union of Peasants (GUP) is the sole organisation/industry association for farmers in Syria. Founded in 1964, the Union was formed from numerous agricultural cooperatives that had been active in Syria since 1943.

The Union distributes a magazine relating to the activities and goals of the union, this magazine is called "The Journal of the Struggle of the Peasants".

The union is closely linked with the ruling Arab Socialist Ba'ath Party and is a member of the National Progressive Front. In 2018 the union held a ceremony to celebrate the 54th anniversary of its establishment in Damascus. In the ceremony, Secretary General Ahmed Saleh Ibrahim further emphasized loyalty to the Politics of Syria/Syrian government. Numerous high-ranking members of the ruling Ba'ath party attended the ceremony.

References

Economy of the Arab League
International Confederation of Arab Trade Unions
Organizations associated with the Ba'ath Party
Trade unions in Syria